Zero Waste SA was an agency of the Government of South Australia, charged with oversight of waste management within South Australia, including the promotion of waste recycling and waste minimisation. It had the goal of reducing waste to zero.

References

External links
Zero Waste SA

Waste organizations
Former government agencies of South Australia
Waste management in Australia